U-62 may refer to one of the following German submarines:

 , a Type U 57 submarine launched in 1916 and that served in the First World War until surrendered on 22 November 1918; broken up at Bo'ness in 1920–21
 During the First World War, Germany also had these submarines with similar names:
 , a Type UB III submarine launched in 1917 and surrendered on 21 November 1918; broken up at Swansea in 1922
 , a Type UC II submarine launched in 1916 and sunk on 14 October 1917
 , a Type IIC submarine that served in the Second World War until scuttled 2 May 1945

Submarines of Germany